Tweed Heads is a town in New South Wales. It is located on the Tweed River in north-eastern New South Wales, Australia, in Tweed Shire, next to the border with Queensland and adjacent to its "twin town" of Coolangatta, which is a suburb of the Gold Coast. It is often referred to as a town where people can change time zones – even celebrate New Year twice within an hour – simply by crossing the street, due to its proximity to the Queensland border, and the fact that New South Wales observes daylight saving whereas Queensland does not.

History
In 1823 John Oxley was the first European to see the Tweed Valley, and he wrote of it:
"A deep rich valley clothed with magnificent trees, the beautiful uniformity of which was only interrupted by the turns and windings of the river, which here and there appeared like small lakes. The background was Mt. Warning. The view was altogether beautiful beyond description. The scenery here exceeded anything I have previously seen in Australia."

Timber cutters originally moved to the Tweed Valley in 1844. After the timber had been cleared, farmers moved in with bananas, cane and dairy farming dominating the area, while a fishing industry developed.  The first school opened in 1871.

In May 1888, 119 subdivided lots of "Boyd Estate" were advertised to be auctioned by W. H. Brett. A map advertising the auction shows that the estate was located next to the Tweed River.

Tweed Heads was once connected to the Queensland Railways system, with the South Coast line providing a direct connection to Brisbane. The railway opened on 10 August 1903 It had been hoped that the New South Wales government would extend their railway line from Murwillumbah to Tweed Heads, but this did not occur due to cost of resuming the land and the expenses associated with the tunnel and bridge that would be required. The Tweed Heads railway station was located on the western side of Enid Street between Bay Street and Frances Street. The railway line to Brisbane closed in 1961; the site of the station has been converted to parklands and commercial development.

The Tweed Heads and Coolangatta Surf Life Saving Club opened on 13 September 1911.

In April 1916, 69 allotments of "Charles' Tweed Heads subdivision were advertised to be auctioned by P. Smith & Son. A map advertising the auction shows the location of the estate in proximity to Terranora Creek.

In November 1917, 46 subdivided allotments of "Marks Estate" were advertised for auction by S. A. Thornton. A map advertising the auction illustrates the location of the estate in proximity to Terranora Creek, Coolangatta and the Pacific Ocean and describes the allotments as perfectly flat, large areas with splendid frontages.

The Tweed Shire, inclusive Murwillumbah was declared in 1947.

Tweed Heads was the location of fictional town Porpoise Spit in the 1994 movie Muriel's Wedding.

In April 2020, checkpoint barriers were established in Tweed streets near the state border to restrict travel into Queensland during the COVID-19 pandemic.

Tourism
Given its proximity to the Gold Coast, Tweed Heads has a shared economy with Coolangatta based heavily on tourism.

Tweed Heads' most popular tourist destinations include Mount Warning, one of the largest shield volcanoes in the Southern Hemisphere, and the nearby Nightcap, Border Ranges, Springbrook and Lamington National Parks, which abound with sub-tropical fauna and flora.

Television
Some areas of the Tweed can receive both TV broadcasts from Brisbane and the Northern NSW. Brisbane stations are Seven Brisbane BTQ, Nine Brisbane QTQ, and 10 Brisbane TVQ. The local Northern NSW stations are Seven, Nine and WIN Television’s 10 Northern NSW.

Demographics
In the 2016 census, Tweed Heads (suburb) recorded a population of 8,176 people made up of 52.2 percent female and 47.8 percent male. Aboriginal and Torres Strait Islander people made up 2.4% of the population.  The median age of the population was 56 years, 18 years above the Australian median. This has made the Tweed Heads region a prime location for retirement living, with 14 separate retirement villages. 69.6% of people were born in Australia. The next most common countries of birth were England 5.8% and New Zealand 3.6%. 83.8% of people spoke only English at home.

The most common responses for religion were No Religion 26.3%, Catholic 24.1% and Anglican 20.4%.

Composition of the Tweed Heads urban area Population by Statistical Local Area:

Amenities
Banora Point Uniting Church is at 63 Darlington Drive.

Retirement Living
Below are a list of retirement villages and retirement living facilities in the Tweed Region:

Serene Living 
Tall Trees Care Communities Banora Point
Palm Lake Resort
Aveo Banora Point
Tweed Broadwater Village
Southern Cross Car St Joseph's Villa
Fairways
Winders Retirement Community
St Cuthbert's Retirement Living Complexes
Darlington Retirement Community
Southern Cross Care St Martha
Ocean View Banora Point
Bangalor Retreat
Gateway Lifestyle Tweed Shores

Sport and recreation
Due to its close proximity, Tweed Heads sports teams often compete in Gold Coast/Queensland-based competitions, and the area acts as a feeder zone for both the Gold Coast Titans in the National Rugby League and the Gold Coast Suns in the Australian Football League. Tweed United is a soccer Club based in the area that competes in the Football Gold Coast competition plus the Coolangatta Tweed Barbarians who compete in the Gold Coast and District Rugby Union. Other sports facilities in the area include Tweed Heads Bowls Club, Tweed Heads Rowing Club, Coolangatta & Tweed Heads Golf Club, Tweed Valley Sailing Club and Tweed Heads & Coolangatta Surf Life Saving Club.

Rugby league
Tweed Heads was once home to several iterations of professional rugby league clubs in the New South Wales Rugby League (NSWRL) competition between 1988 and 1995. The Gold Coast-Tweed Giants were established in 1988 and based out of the Tweed Heads Seagulls premises in west Tweed Heads. The Seagulls ran a very successful social club that turned large profits due to poker machines and by 1990 the club had acquired the Giants' NSWRL licence and rebranded the team to become the Gold Coast Seagulls, despite remaining based in Tweed Heads. The team pulled off its biggest coup in 1990 when it signed future Rugby League Immortal Wally Lewis. After years of poor on field results and low attendances, the Seagulls sold their NSWRL licence to businessman Jeff Muller who moved the team to Carrara on the Gold Coast.

The Seagulls returned to the Group 18 Rugby League competition in 1996 and were granted entry into the Queensland Cup in 2003. Australian rules football was brought to the area in 1962 when the Coolangatta Tweed Heads Australian Football Club. It was intended to represent the twin towns of Coolangatta and Tweed Heads and competed in the Gold Coast Australian Football League competition. In 1984 the Northern Rivers region established the Summerland Australian Football League that later included the Tweed Coast Football Club. The league was amalgamated into Queensland Australian Football League as its own division in 2012.

Notable people

The following is a list of notable people who were born, resided, or died in Tweed Heads: 

 Wayne Bartholomew, world champion surfer
 Cheyse Blair, rugby league footballer
 Trevor Butler, 2004 Big Brother Australia winner
 Larry Corowa, rugby league footballer
 Brad Davis, rugby league footballer
 Steve Edmed, rugby league footballer
 Mick Fanning, world champion surfer
 Sam Gilbert, Australian rules footballer
 Stephanie Gilmore, world champion surfer
 Michael Gordon, rugby league footballer
 David Hale, Australian rules footballer
 Samantha Harris, fashion model
 Daniel Holdsworth, rugby league footballer
 Ryan James, rugby league footballer
 Jesse Joyce, Australian rules footballer
 Kayne Lawton, rugby league footballer
 Tom Learoyd-Lahrs, rugby league footballer
 Marc Lock, Australian rules footballer
 Lionel Morgan, rugby league footballer
 Barry Muir, rugby league footballer
 Luke O'Dwyer, rugby league footballer
 Mark Occhilupo, world champion surfer
 Joel Parkinson, world champion surfer
 Cedric Popkin, soldier who may have killed Manfred von Richthofen during World War I
 Tony Rampling, rugby league footballer
 Kieran Ricketts, journalist, broadcaster, and filmmaker
 James Roberts, Australian Olympic swimmer
 Matt Seers, rugby league footballer
 Elwyn Walters, rugby league footballer
 Jarrad Wright, creator and star of The Big Lez Show

See also

References

External links

 
 Tweed Shire Council

 
Populated places established in 1844
Fishing communities in Australia
Tweed Shire
1844 establishments in Australia